Sardinha is a Portuguese surname. Notable people with the surname include:

António Sardinha (1887–1925), Portuguese writer
Bronson Sardinha (born 1983), American baseball player
Dane Sardinha (born 1979), American baseball player
Francisco Sardinha (born 1946), Indian politician
Pero Fernandes Sardinha (1496–1556), Portuguese bishop
Richard Sardinha, American artist

Portuguese-language surnames